Painless refers to the absence of pain.

Painless may also refer to:

Painless (film), a 2012 fantasy horror film
Painless (album), a 2022 album by Nilüfer Yanya
"Painless" (song), a 1991 single by Baby Animals
Painless (House), an episode of the television series House
"The Painless", a track on the 1991 album Gothic by Paradise Lost